McLean Group of Companies is collective of companies owned by the McLean family in Vancouver, British Columbia, Canada. The company's head offices are located in Vancouver and primarily invests in the development of real estate projects in North America. The company also has businesses in aviation, film, and telecommunications. The aggregate value of the company's development projects are estimated at around US$1 billion. Among its most notably controlled companies are Vancouver Film Studios, The Landing, Pacific Backlot Services, Signal Systems, and Blackcomb Helicopters.

History
The McLean Group of Companies was founded by David McLean in 1972. The company originally started in real estate investment in the Vancouver area and later branched of to other places in Canada such as, Alberta, British Columbia, and Ontario. They also invest within the United States in states such as California, Georgia, Washington, and Hawaii.

In the 1980s the company purchased Northstar International Studios which later became Vancouver Film Studios.

Vancouver Film Studios
See Vancouver Film Studios

In 1987, The McLean Group of Companies purchased Northstar International Studios which marked the beginning of film production for the company. The film production centre has expanded beyond the original building of NIS, which has since been renamed, 'Studio D' and continues to be Vancouver Film Studio's busiest 'studio'. In 1998 Northstar International Studios was renamed Vancouver Film Studios. VFS in 2006 was the recipient of a BC Export Award in the New Media and Entertainment section, and was recognized as one of the top 21 exporters in British Columbia, Canada.

The Landing
The building is located in historic Gastown at 375 Water Street and was renovated and partly reconstructed in 1987 for safety reasons. 

The Landing is one of many real estate companies the McLean Group owns. Other related companies are Erinmore Management, Blanca Realty, McLean & McLean, and Harbour Landing Construction.

Pacific Backlot Services

In 2000, The McLean Group founded Pacific Backlot Services, the on-lot production services department of Vancouver Film Studios. Since, it has expanded to service productions not just at VFS, and still remains a corporate subsidiary.

Signal Systems
Originally a department of Vancouver Film Studios, the company has emerged to become an independent telecommunications company operated by the McLean Group.< The company specializes in wireless, satellite, radio, and IP communications. Sacha McLean is the President and COO. The company has partnerships with Bell Canada, Cisco Systems, David Clark Company, Otto Engineering, Daniels Electronics Limited, and Hutton Canada.

Blackcomb Helicopters
Blackcomb Helicopters, Ltd was founded in 1989 by Steve Flynn.  The McLean group acquired the company in 2006.  The company primarily participates in commercial operations in the tourism, film, and skiing industry around Whistler-Blackcomb. It is also contracted by the resort and government for fire fighting, rescue, and construction.
Additionally, Blackcomb Helicopters, also known as Blackcomb Aviation has operational bases in Vancouver, Sechelt, Squamish and Pemberton making it the primary helicopter operator in the Sea to Sky region of British Columbia.
The company is also one of the leading providers of helicopters to the Western Canadian film industry.  Recent credits have included feature films such as The A-Team, Fantastic Four - Rise of the Silver Surfer, X-Files - I Want To Believe and Shooter.

The McLean McCuaig Foundation
The McLean McCuaig Foundation is a charitable foundation of The McLean Group of Companies.

References

External links
 Company Overview
 Auto dealers group spent $888K lobbying in 4Q
 Exploring an exit strategy
 http://www.pr.com/press-release/136077

Companies based in Vancouver